The Ireland cricket team were scheduled to tour Zimbabwe in April 2020 to play three One Day International (ODI) and three Twenty20 International (T20I) matches. All of the matches were scheduled to take place at the Queens Sports Club in Bulawayo. Ireland last toured Zimbabwe in March 2018 for the Cricket World Cup Qualifier, and last played bilateral series in Zimbabwe in October 2015. However, on 16 March 2020, the tour was cancelled due to the COVID-19 pandemic.

An attempt to play the fixtures in April 2021 was called off in February 2021, due to the ongoing situation regarding the pandemic in Zimbabwe. However, Zimbabwe Cricket issued a statement saying that the tour had been called off due to "scheduling challenges" and not the COVID-19 pandemic.

T20I series

1st T20I

2nd T20I

3rd T20I

ODI series

1st ODI

2nd ODI

3rd ODI

References

External links
 Series home at ESPN Cricinfo

2020 in Irish cricket
2020 in Zimbabwean cricket
International cricket competitions in 2019–20
Irish cricket tours of Zimbabwe
Cricket events postponed due to the COVID-19 pandemic